The Jorhat Govt. Boys' H.S and M.P. School was established in 1883 during British rule in India. It is situated in Sonaru Path, near Head Post Office, Jorhat. There are 56 staff and around 1600 students. The language of instruction is Assamese. Students of the Govt. Boys appear for High School Leaving Certificate (class 10 exam) under the Board of Secondary Education, Assam and Higher Secondary School Leaving Certificate (equivalent to class 12) under Assam Higher Secondary Education Council.

In 1867, George Williamson, a senior administrative officer donated Rs. one lakh, for the propagation of technical education at Jorhat and Golaghat. With that donation, Williamson Artizan School was established at Jorhat in 1876 with eight students. A high school as per government policy was established at Kohima, which is a district headquarters. However, the school had closed for the want of students. There was demand for a high school at Jorhat and hence the Kohima High School was shifted to Jorhat in 1883 and was amalgamated with Williamson School. The school is now best known as Jorhat Govt. Boys' Higher Secondary and Multipurpose School.

References

External links
Official website

Educational institutions established in 1883
High schools and secondary schools in Assam
Boys' schools in India
Education in Jorhat district
1883 establishments in India